Galleria Mall may refer to a variety of shopping malls, including:
CambridgeSide Galleria, Cambridge, Massachusetts
The Galleria, Houston, Texas
Galleria at Crystal Run, Wallkill, New York
Galleria Dallas, Dallas, Texas
Galleria Shopping Centre (Toronto)
Galleria Shopping Mall, Amanzimtoti, South Africa 
Galleria at White Plains, White Plains, New York
Luk Yeung Galleria, Tsuen Wan, Hong Kong
Poughkeepsie Galleria, Poughkeepsie, New York
Silver City Galleria, East Taunton, Massachusetts
Stonestown Galleria, San Francisco, California 
Tysons Galleria, McLean, Virginia
Walden Galleria, Buffalo, New York
Westfield Galleria at Roseville, California
York Galleria Mall, York, Pennsylvania

See also
Galleria (disambiguation)